Kinecta Federal Credit Union is a federally chartered credit union based in Manhattan Beach, California. Originally chartered in 1940, Kinecta has 275,000+ Members and assets in excess of $6.5 billion as of 2021. Kinecta has 32 branches in three states: California, New York, and New Jersey. Kinecta offers a diverse array of products and services for businesses and individuals, include checking and savings accounts; auto loans, RV and boat loans, credit cards; mortgage loans; home equity loans, and lines of credit; business accounts, loans, and credit cards.

History

Kinecta was originally known as the Hughes Aircraft Employees Federal Credit Union (HAEFCU). HAEFCU was formed in 1940 by twelve Hughes Aircraft engineers with total assets of $60. In 2001, HAEFCU changed its name to Kinecta Federal Credit Union after Raytheon Corporation's 1997 acquisition of Hughes Aircraft Company.

In April 2021 Kinecta and Xceed Financial Credit Union merged.

Products and services

Kinecta provides products and services to individuals and businesses. For Individual Members, there are checking accounts, long or short-term savings options including IRAs or HSAs; mortgage, auto, and equity loans; lines of credit for debt consolidation; and investment planning options.

Locationsdepositaccounts.com
California
 Brea
 El Segundo
 Fountain Valley
 Gardena
 Goleta
 Hawthorne
 Hermosa Beach
 Huntington Beach
 Lakewood
 Malibu
 Manhattan Beach
 Menlo Park
 Newport Beach
 Redondo Beach
 Rolling Hills Estates
 San Jose
 Santa Monica
 Torrance
 Tustin
 Westchester
 Westlake Village
 Woodland Hills
New Jersey
 Parsippany
New York
 Rochester
 Webster (town)

References

External links
 Kinecta Federal Credit Union — official site
 Credit Union National Association

Credit unions based in California
Banks established in 1940